A Collection of Original Local Songs (full title - “A Collection of original local songs by Thomas Marshall – Printed for the author by Wm Fordyce, Dean Street, Newcastle 1829)  is a Chapbook of Geordie folk song consisting of eleven songs written by Thomas Marshall, published in 1829, by the author himself.

The publication 
Thomas Marshall wrote all the songs.

A set of the original documents are retained in the archives of Gateshead Council. .

Contents 
Are as below :-<br/ >

See also 
Geordie dialect words

References

External links
 FARNE - Folk Archive Resource North East – front cover
 Allan’s Illustrated Edition of Tyneside songs and readings

English folk songs
Songs related to Newcastle upon Tyne
Northumbrian folklore
Chapbooks